Earlswood Common is an   Local Nature Reserve in Redhill in Surrey. It is owned and managed by Reigate and Banstead Borough Council.

Habitats on the common include woodland, semi-improved grassland, two large lakes, several ponds and wetland corridors. There are diverse insect species and mammals such as roe deer, foxes, rabbits and bats.

There are a number of access points, including ones on Pendleton Road, which goes through the common.

References

Local Nature Reserves in Surrey